The 2009–10 Copa del Rey was the 108th staging of the Copa del Rey (including two seasons where two rival editions were played). The competition began on 22 August 2009 and concluded on 19 May 2010 with the final held at the Camp Nou in Barcelona, in which Sevilla lifted the trophy for the fifth time in their history with a 2–0 victory over Atlético Madrid. The defending cup holders were Barcelona, but they were eliminated by Sevilla in the round of 16.

This tournament had quite a number of notable upsets, including Barcelona's early exit in the round of 16, and Real Madrid's shocking 4–0 loss to Alcorcón, which was subsequently nicknamed the "Alcorconazo" and contributed to Real Madrid's early exit in the round of 32.

Qualified teams 
The following teams competed in the Copa del Rey 2009–10:

20 teams of 2008–09 La Liga:

 Almería
 Athletic Bilbao
 Atlético Madrid
 Barcelona
 Betis
 Deportivo
 Espanyol
 Getafe
 Málaga
 Mallorca
 Numancia
 Osasuna
 Racing Santander
 Real Madrid
 Recreativo
 Sevilla
 Sporting Gijón
 Valencia
 Valladolid
 Villarreal

21 teams of 2008–09 Segunda División (Sevilla Atlético were excluded for being a reserve team of Sevilla):

 Alavés
 Albacete
 Alicante
 Castellón
 Celta
 Córdoba
 Eibar
 Elche
 Gimnàstic
 Girona
 Hércules
 Huesca
 Las Palmas
 Levante
 Murcia
 Rayo Vallecano
 Real Sociedad
 Salamanca
 Tenerife
 Xerez
 Zaragoza

24 teams of 2008–09 Segunda División B. Teams that qualified were the top five teams of each of the 4 groups (excluding reserve teams) and the four with the highest number of points out of the remaining non-reserve teams (*):

 Real Unión
 Cultural Leonesa
 Ponferradina
 Zamora
 Lemona
 Cartagena
 Lorca Deportiva
 Alcorcón
 Leganés
 Mérida
 Alcoyano
 Sant Andreu
 Sabadell
 Ontinyent
 Gramenet
 Cádiz
 Real Jaén
 Poli Ejido
 Marbella
 Puertollano
 Atlético Ciudad*
 Conquense*
 Ceuta*
 Melilla*

18 teams of 2008–09 Tercera División. Teams that qualified were the champions of each of the 18 groups (or at least the ones with the highest number of points within their group since reserve teams were excluded):

 Compostela
 Real Oviedo
 Gimnástica
 Lagun Onak
 Reus Deportiu
 Villajoyosa
 Alcalá
 Palencia
 Unión Estepona
 San Roque
 Sporting Mahonés
 Tenisca
 Caravaca
 Cerro Reyes
 Izarra
 Logroñés
 Monzón
 Toledo

First round 
The matches were played on 22, 25, 26 and 27 August 2009.

|}
Alcorcón, Alcoyano, Atlético Ciudad, Mérida, Ontinyent and Poli Ejido received a bye.

Second round 
The matches were played on 1, 2, 3, 9 and 16 September 2009.

|}
Recreativo received a bye.

Third round 
The matches were played on 7 October 2009.

|}
Real Murcia received a bye.

Final phase bracket 
Teams that are listed first play at home in the first leg.

Round of 32 
The first leg matches were played on 27, 28 and 29 October while the second legs were played on 10, 11 and 12 November 2009.

|}

Round of 16 
The first leg matches were played on 5, 6 and 7 January while the second legs were played on 12, 13 and 14 January 2010.

|}

First legs

Second legs

Quarter-finals 

|}

First legs

Second legs

Semi-finals 

|}

First legs

Second legs

Final

Top goalscorers

References

External links 
 marca.com 
 AS.com 

 
Copa del Rey seasons
1